Intern: A Doctor's Initiation is a 2007 nonfiction autobiographical account of Sandeep Jauhar's first year as a medical intern, immediately following medical school. At New York Hospital, he kept records in  journals about his days, patients, and interaction with other doctors. He used his journals to write his memoir, which focuses on his introduction to practicing medicine, his  disillusionment as a medical student, and his imposter syndrome.

Background 
Sandeep Jauhar grew up   in Riverside, California. Jauhar studied experimental physics at the University of California, Berkeley, but was also interested in journalism. After graduating with his Ph.D. in experimental physics, he was accepted into the AAAS Mass Media Fellowship, a scientific journalism fellowship. He moved to Washington D.C. to write for TIME Magazine for a summer. The following fall semester, he started medical school at Washington University in St. Louis, where he received his medical doctorate.

Upon completing medical school, he began his medical internship at New York Hospital (now NewYork-Presbyterian/Weill Cornell Medical Center). During his internship, Jauhar kept a daily journal where he documented his experiences and feelings. A few years later, an editor from Farrar, Straus and Giroux offered him a contract to write a bildungsroman about his medical education. Jauhar agreed, leading to the publication of Intern: A Doctor’s Initiation.

Themes

Disillusionment 
A major theme in Intern: A Doctor's Initiation is the dark, looming of disillusionment. Jauhar expressed in many medical situation in the book that he feels anxious, alone, and lost. As Jauhar would do rounds with his patients, each medical procedure he did made him feel uneasy and ill-prepared. One of the first experiences he describes his anxiousness is when he in a consultation with his patient Dr. Washington, an older woman who was an obstetrician gynecologist. This visit was the first time Jauhar performed a rectal exam. He explains that he is not sure of what he needs to feel or say because he is so unprepared and amateur at the procedure. Another example of Jauhar's disillusionment is his embarrassment in front of others. In a procedure of inserting arterial lines, while another intern was able to successfully do the procedure, Jauhar was not able to. He wrote in his journal that he felt like a "shell of a resident." He felt alone in his cluelessness and was not sure if anyone was able to relate to him.

Medical education 
In the time of Jauhar's internship, these students were required to work days on end on call to respond quickly to emergencies. In the novel, Jauhar expressed that the overwhelming work as a doctor was tiring and felt impossible, he admitted that "If you did everything, you felt overwhelmed, if you didn't, you felt guilty." This issue in medical education was changed in the 1980s, where a limit on hours given to interns/student working in the hospital was signed into law. These students were given less hours in order to lessen the burden of fatigue and to improve patient care. Jauhar criticizes the limitation because he believes that both options have shortcomings. He explains that those students who now are given less hours start each shift with new cases, not able to follow a case for several days. He believes that this can cause incomplete training in medicine and also cause training physicians to see patients as cases and not humans. The medical education criticism in the novel also touches on how doctors become apathetic towards their patients. When treating a patient who was experiencing worsening seizures, Jauhar admits that he had felt his confidence increasing as he understood that he was "fighting a losing battle." This, in Jauhar's point of view, can show how doctor's see patients as test dummies, able to manipulate the situation to learn and experience.

Critical reception 
Intern: A Doctor's Initiation has been read by both those in or interested in the medical profession and also by those interested in human behavior and connection.   Jauhar has received   positive feedback in regards to his medical memoir, showing readers the humanistic view of doctors and the struggles of mental health as a health care professional

References

Memoirs
2007 non-fiction books
Books about health care
Autobiographies
Bildungsromans